The Opeongo Hills (sometimes called the Opeongo Mountains or Madawaska Highlands, particularly for the easternmost hills) are a range of hills in Southern Ontario, near Algonquin Provincial Park. The hills stretch from Opeongo Lake in Algonquin Park in the west, along the Madawaska and Opeongo Rivers, towards the Opeongo Colonization Road, and extending towards the Deacon Escarpment (north of Killaloe, Ontario in Renfrew County), Bonnechere, Ontario, and Dacre in the east. To the east of the Opeongo Hills lie the Madawaska River valley, the Mississippi River Valley, and the Ottawa-Bonnechere Graben along the Ottawa River. Its tallest peak is roughly 7 km northeast of Highway 60. At roughly 586 meters, it is the tallest point in Southern Ontario. The community of Foymount (along the former Highway 512, the Opeongo Line) is one of the highest settlements in Southern Ontario.

The Opeongo Hills are a continuation of the Laurentian Highlands, which extend into Eastern Ontario, towards Gananoque, and across the Ottawa River Valley into Quebec, and the Laurentian Mountains, which continue parallel to the St. Lawrence River, north of Montreal, Trois-Rivières and Quebec City.

The geography in this area of Central Ontario is dotted with rolling hills and forests with streams, lakes, and small waterfalls, typical of a place in the Canadian Shield.

The first European explorer to visit the region is Samuel de Champlain, in 1615, while exploring the area with the Huron natives. When settlers first started arriving in the area in the late 1790s and early 19th century, land areas were given to settlers by the Canadian Land and Emigration Company for settlement and farming. The soils of the area were not perfectly suited for farming, but small-scale agriculture was able to be conducted on the land. Today, the Opeongo Hills are crossed by many provincial highways, many of which still follow the original Historic Colonization Roads.

Municipalities located in the Opeongo Hills
Below is a list of communities and municipalities located in the Opeongo Hills, from west to east

Frontenac County
 Frontenac County
 North Frontenac

Haliburton County
 Haliburton County
 Dysart, Bruton, Clyde, Dudley, Eyre, Guilford, Harburn, Harcourt and Havelock
 Haliburton, Ontario
 Highland East
 Algonquin Highlands
 Minden Hills
 Minden, Ontario

Hastings County

 Hastings County
 Bancroft
 Faraday
 Paudash
 Carlow/Mayo
 Hastings Highlands, Ontario
 Maynooth

Lanark County
 Lanark County
 Lanark Highlands

Lennox and Addington County
 Lennox and Addington
 Addington Highlands

Nipissing District
 Nipissing District
 South Algonquin, Ontario
 Madawaska
 Whitney

Renfrew County

 Renfrew County
 Greater Madawaska
 Calabogie
 Madawaska Valley, Ontario
 Barry's Bay
 Combermere
 Killaloe, Hagarty and Richards
 Bonnechere, Ontario
 Wilno, Ontario
 Laurentian Valley
 North Algona-Wilberforce
 Bonnechere Valley
 Eganville
 Hyndford
 Balaclava
 Brudenell, Lyndoch and Raglan
 Craigmont
 Quadeville

Lakes and rivers
 Bark Lake
 Bonnechere River
 Lake Clear
 Constant Lake
 Lake Doré
 Golden Lake
 Kamaniskeg Lake
 Little Mississippi River
 Madawaska River
 Meadow Lake
 Mississippi River (eastern boundary of the Hills)
 Opeongo Lake
 Opeongo River
 Papineau Lake
 Snake River (Renfrew County)
 Round Lake
 York River

Parks
Below is a list of Conservation areas, Provincial and National parks located in the Opeongo Hills
 Algonquin Provincial Park
 Bell Bay Provincial Park
 Bon Echo Provincial Park
 Bonnechere Provincial Park
 Bonnechere River Provincial Park
 Centennial Lake Provincial Park
 Conroys Marsh Provincial Conservation Reserve
 Constant Creek Swamp and Fen Provincial Conservation Reserve
 Deacon Escarpment Provincial Conservation Reserve
 Dividing Lake Provincial Nature Preserve
 Foy Provincial Park
 Egan Chutes Provincial Park
 Lake St. Peter Provincial Park
 Little Mississippi River Provincial Conservation Reserve
 Matawatchan Provincial Park
 North Frontenac Park Lands
 Opeongo River Provincial Park
 Silent Lake Provincial Park
 Upper Madawaska River Provincial Park

Roads

Roads that cross the Opeongo Hills include:

  Highway 28 (part)
  Highway 41
  Highway 60
  Highway 62 (part)
  Highway 127
  Highway 132
  Highway 532

Notable attractions
 Balaclava ghost town
 Art Gallery of Bancroft
 Opeongo Mountains Resort, in Eganville
 Bonnechere Caves, near Fourth Chute
 Quadeville is home to a cottage once owned by famed gangster Al Capone. It still stands to this day north of the hamlet near a ghost town called Letterkenny.
 Near the intersection of Highways 41 and Highway 132 is a spot known as "Magnetic Hill", where the road slopes uphill but appears to be going downhill.
 Mount Pakenham Ski Resort, near Pakenham, Ontario
 Calabogie Peaks Ski Resort

External links
 Opeongo Hills at Roots and Rivers.ca
 TheKingsHighway.ca
 OntHighways.com

Mountain ranges of Ontario
Landforms of Renfrew County
Landforms of Hastings County
Landforms of Nipissing District